The brown-winged schiffornis (Schiffornis turdina), is a species of Neotropical bird in the family Tityridae.

Taxonomy
The brown-winged schiffornis has traditionally been placed in the manakin family, but evidence strongly suggest it is better placed in Tityridae, where it is now placed by the South American Classification Committee.

The species was split by the AOU in 2013 from the species complex thrush-like schiffornis.

Description
It is medium-sized, about 24 cm (9 in.) long. Depending on subspecies, it is overall brownish or olive. The belly is often greyish.

Distribution and habitat
It is found in Amazon rainforest and eastern Brazil. Its natural habitats are subtropical or tropical moist lowland forest and subtropical or tropical moist montane forest.

References

 Howell, Steve N.G., and Sophie Webb. "A Guide to the Birds of Mexico and Northern Central America." Oxford University Press, New York, 1995.

Further reading

brown-winged schiffornis
Birds of the Amazon Basin
Birds of the Atlantic Forest
brown-winged schiffornis
Birds of Brazil
Taxonomy articles created by Polbot